Sporthal Arena is an indoor arena in Deurne, Antwerp, Belgium. Built it 1966, it has a capacity for 2,100 people, 1,196 of which are seating capacity. An 800,000 Euro renovation works took place between April 2008-February 2009. The basketball club Antwerp Diamond Giants used the arena before moving to Lotto Arena, and the club junior squad as well as practice sessions of the senior squad still take place at the arena.

The arena hosted the 1971 FIBA European Champions cup final in which CSKA Moscow defeated Ignis Varese 67-53 and the 1975 final of the same competition in which Ignis Varese defeated Real Madrid 79–66.

See also
List of indoor arenas in Belgium

References

External links

Sporthal Arena (Deurne)

Defunct basketball venues
Indoor arenas in Belgium
Sports venues in Antwerp Province
Sport in Antwerp
Buildings and structures in Antwerp